Agustín Sauto Arana (11 May 1908 – 21 August 1986), known as Bata, was a Spanish footballer who played as a striker.

He spent most of his career with Athletic Bilbao, scoring 208 goals in as many matches across all competitions and winning four La Liga championships.
He is the only player to have scored 7 goals against Barcelona in a single match. The goals were scored during the 1930/1931 Laliga season in which Bilbao crushed the Catalans 12-1

Club career
Born in Barakaldo, Biscay, Bata started his career at hometown club Barakaldo CF. His nickname derived from the fact he used to wear an overall (bata in Spanish) made by his mother in order to prevent him from staining his better clothes; he was also dubbed El Bertha bilbaino (Bilbao's Bertha), El terror de San Mamés (terror of San Mamés) and El león enfurecido (raging lion).

Bata signed with Athletic Bilbao in 1929, and made his professional debut for them on 22 September in a 4–1 win against Deportivo Alavés for the Biscay Championship. In his first season, he won both the La Liga and Copa del Rey titles. His first goal in the former competition came on 23 March 1930, in a 4–3 success at Atlético Madrid; he was the focal point of what become a famous forward line at the club, along with José Iraragorri, Chirri II, Lafuente and Guillermo Gorostiza.

Bata achieved the same feat of league and cup double the following campaign, while also earning the Pichichi Trophy having scored 27 goals. Seven of those came in Athletic's historic 12–1 defeat of FC Barcelona on 18 February 1931, even though some sources only awarded him five and others as many as eight; he continued to play regularly until 1935–36 when he won the championship for a fourth time, but his career was then effectively ended at the age of 28 by the outbreak of the Spanish Civil War.

In the summer of 1938, Bata re-joined Barakaldo, but the competition would only be resumed the following year after the end of the war. He retired at the age of 35 after four seasons in Segunda División, and died on 21 August 1986 at 78 in Valle de Trápaga-Trapagaran.

International career
In spite of his club achievements, Bata won only one cap for the Spain national team. It happened on 19 April 1931, in a friendly with Italy played in Bilbao.

Career statistics

Club

Honours

Club
Athletic Bilbao
La Liga: 1929–30, 1930–31, 1933–34, 1935–36
Copa del Rey: 1930, 1931, 1932, 1933

Individual
Pichichi Trophy: 1930–31, 1931–32

References

External links

1908 births
1986 deaths
Spanish footballers
Footballers from Barakaldo
Association football forwards
La Liga players
Segunda División players
Barakaldo CF footballers
Athletic Bilbao footballers
CA Osasuna players
Spain international footballers
Basque Country international footballers
Pichichi Trophy winners